The EP200 passenger AC electric locomotive has  of power and design speed of up to . The underframe with two unique four-axle wheel trucks coupled with support - frame suspension of commutator-less motors and traction gear boxes (two-level bogie swing suspension with cylindrical spiral springs and hydraulic oscillation dampers) ensure high riding properties and dynamic characteristics of the EP200 Passenger Electric Locomotive.

See also
 The Museum of the Moscow Railway, at Paveletsky Rail Terminal, Moscow
 Rizhsky Rail Terminal, home of the Moscow Railway Museum
 Varshavsky Rail Terminal, St.Petersburg, Home of the Central Museum of Railway Transport, Russian Federation
 History of rail transport in Russia

References

Railway locomotives introduced in 1996
ЭП200
25 kV AC locomotives
5 ft gauge locomotives